Finto Manereg Forest Park is a forest park in the Gambia. Established on January 1, 1954, it covers 1106 hectares.

It is located on a terrain with an estimated altitude of 30 meters.

References
  

Protected areas established in 1954
Forest parks of the Gambia